Charles Frederick Scott (September 7, 1860 – September 18, 1938) was a United States House of Representatives from Kansas.

Biography 
Born near Iola, Kansas, Scott attended the common schools. He was graduated from the University of Kansas at Lawrence in 1881. He went to Colorado, New Mexico, and Arizona, and was engaged chiefly in clerical work. He returned to Iola in 1882 and edited the Iola Register. He was appointed regent of the university in 1891–1900. He served as member of the Kansas State Senate from 1892 to 1896.

Scott was elected as a Republican to the 57th Congress and to the four succeeding Congresses (1901–1911). He served as chairman of the Committee on Agriculture (60th and 61st Congresses).

Scott was an unsuccessful candidate for reelection in 1910 to the 62nd Congress. He was appointed one of five delegates to the International Institute of Agriculture at Rome in 1911. He lectured on Chautauqua platform in 1913, 1915, and 1916. He served as delegate to the Republican National Conventions in 1916 and 1932

Scott was an unsuccessful candidate for nomination to the United States Senate in 1918 and again in 1928. He resumed newspaper work until his death in Iola, Kansas, on September 18, 1938. He was interred in Iola Cemetery.

References

Footnotes

Sources

External links 
 
 

1860 births
1938 deaths
Republican Party Kansas state senators
People from Iola, Kansas
Republican Party members of the United States House of Representatives from Kansas